Corymbia intermedia, commonly known as the pink bloodwood, is a species of medium to tall tree that is endemic to north-eastern Australia. It has rough, tessellated bark on the trunk and branches, flower buds in groups of seven, white flowers and oval to barrel-shaped fruit.

Description
The pink bloodwood is tree that can reach  in height with a  spread. The bark is rough, tessellated, light brown to grey in colour and extends from the trunk to the branches.

The pink bloodwood resembles the red bloodwood, and the two species co-occur in central New South Wales. The latter species can be distinguished by its larger gumnuts and winged seeds.

Taxonomy
Richard Thomas Baker was the first to formally describe the pink bloodwood in 1901, naming it Eucalyptus intermedia, and publishing the description in Proceedings of the Linnean Society of New South Wales. The species name is derived from the Latin adjective intermedius and is based on the intermediate nature of the oils between the red and yellow bloodwoods.  In 1995, the genus Eucalyptus was split into three genera by Ken Hill and Lawrie Johnson, with E. intermedia transferred into Corymbia.

Hill and Johnson classified Corymbia intermedia in its own series Intermediae, A combined analysis of nuclear rDNA (ETS + ITS) and morphological characters published in 2009 found it to be closely related to C. trachyphloia and C. hendersonii.  C. intermedia and other species were placed in the large section Septentrionales within the subgenus Corymbia. The common name comes from the gum veins in the wood.

Distribution and habitat
The species is found in New South Wales from Gloucester northwards into Queensland, as far as to Cape York — a total range of  — and within  of the eastern coastline. It grows in open forest, or occasionally lone trees grow in closed forest or on the margins of rainforests. It is associated with such species as carbeen (Corymbia tesselaris), broad-leaved stringybark (Eucalyptus caliginosa), forest red gum (E. tereticornis), narrow-leaved ironbark (E. crebra), scribbly gum (E. racemosa),   grey gum (E. propinqua), blackbutt (E. pilularis), flooded gum (E. grandis), red mahogany  (E. resinifera), and black sheoak (Allocasuarina littoralis) and red wattle (Acacia flavescens) in coastal north Queensland.

Ecology
In Bungawalbin National Park in northern New South Wales, the squirrel glider( Petaurus norfolcensis)  has been observed biting and gouging into the bark to make a wound on the trunk of the pink bloodwood and then lick the sap out. The behaviour has also been recorded for the yellow-bellied glider (P. australis) for this species. Study of the forest habitat of the sugar glider (P. breviceps) and mahogany glider ( P. gracilis)  found that the presence of pink bloodwood was corellated with the presence of the former and absence of the latter species.

Study of the impact of perioding burning in forest in southeastern Queensland found no significant difference in trunk diameter of pink bloodwoods in unburnt forest compared with forests burnt every two or four years.

Uses
The dark pink to reddish-brown heartwood is hard and durable usable for building fences and bridges. The sawdust of pink bloodwood is an irritant to eyes and skin.
Corymbia intermedia may be used as a rootstock, onto which the ornamental Corymbia ficifolia is grafted.

References

intermedia
Myrtales of Australia
Flora of Queensland
Flora of New South Wales
Plants described in 1901